SS Stephen R. Mallory was a Liberty ship built in the United States during World War II. She was named after Stephen R. Mallory, a United States senator from Florida, and the Confederate States Secretary of the Navy during the American Civil War.

Construction
Stephen R. Mallory was laid down on 19 October 1943, under a Maritime Commission (MARCOM) contract, MC hull 1540, by J.A. Jones Construction, Panama City, Florida; she was launched on 27 November 1943.

History
She was allocated to Isbrandtsen Steamship Company, on 20 January 1944. On 8 October 1947, she was laid up in the National Defense Reserve Fleet, in the Hudson River Group. On 23 November 1971, she was sold, along with two other ships, for $222,222 to Eckhardt & Co., G.m.b.H., West Germany, to be scrapped. She was removed from the fleet on 6 January 1971.

References

Bibliography

 
 
 
 
 

 

Liberty ships
Ships built in Panama City, Florida
1944 ships
Hudson River Reserve Fleet